Struggle for the Throne is a 1984 board game published by FASA.

Gameplay
Struggle for the Throne is a Star Trek strategy game in which the Klingon emperor is dying, and the players are the leaders of various powerful families, all vying through strength, diplomacy, influence, and skullduggery to become the next emperor.

Reception
Craig Sheeley reviewed Struggle for the Throne in Space Gamer No. 71. Sheeley commented that "Struggle for the Throne is a very good product for FASA; it also puts mini-games back on the market. If you have a lot of sneaky gaming friends, then Struggle for the Throne is worth the steep price."

References

Board games based on Star Trek
Board games introduced in 1984
FASA games